Verrucularia is a genus in the Malpighiaceae, a family of about 75 genera of flowering plants in the order Malpighiales. Verrucularia comprises two species of shrubs native to savannas and sandstone hills of Brazil.

External links
Verrucularia

Malpighiaceae
Malpighiaceae genera